Keremeos is a village in the Southern Interior of British Columbia, Canada. The name originated from the Similkameen dialect of the Okanagan language word "Keremeyeus" meaning "creek which cuts its way through the flats" referring to Keremeos Creek which flows down from the Upper Benchlands to the Similkameen River that flows past the village.

History 
With K Mountain as a backdrop, Keremeos is a community whose "Wild West" looks date back to 1909 when the postmaster of the now-abandoned community of Upper Keremeos, Mr. George Kirby, purchased land alongside the Similkameen River in anticipation of the V.V. & E. Railway passing through the area.  Eventually the Great Northern Railway from the US built a branch line up to Hedley and other businesses soon followed.  Keremeos was incorporated in 1956.

Geography 
The geography of the Keremeos area ranges from cottonwood groves along the river, to dense orchards and farms, to desert-like landscapes along the bases of the surrounding mountains, up to alpine peaks and plateaux on top.

Demographics 

Religion 
According to the 2021 census, religious groups in Keremeos included:
Irreligion (770 persons or 52.7%)
Christianity (630 persons or 43.2%)
Buddhism (20 persons or 1.4%)
Other (15 persons or 1.0%)

Economy 
Keremeos' main industries are horticulture, agriculture, ranching, and wine making, among others. Fruit stands are also a major component of the local economy, making it the self-titled "fruit stand capital of Canada." All sorts of soft fruits, apples, cherries, peaches and vegetables are grown in the South Similkameen's dry warm climate, and vineyards and wineries are quickly being added as the valley's wine-growing potential is being recognized.

Attractions
Attractions include the Keremeos Grist Mill.

Climate 
Keremeos has a semi-arid climate (Köppen BSk) with cool but short winters and hot, dry summers.

Infrastructure

Transportation 
Keremeos is served by public transit in the South Okanagan-Similkameen Transit System along Route 50 thrice weekly year round. Buses go as far as Coalmont, British Columbia to the west and Penticton in the East, with connections on BC Transit to Kelowna and Osoyoos. The thrice-weekly public transit service is the only intercity transportation available to residents after Greyhound terminated their services along the Hope, British Columbia-Penticton corridor on June 1, 2019. The nearest airport with scheduled flights is the Penticton Regional Airport 41 km to the north.  The nearest major airport with international flights is Kelowna International Airport. Keremeos historically had a train station, though no tracks remain in the Similkameen Valley with either the Great Northern Railway or the Kettle Valley Railway.

Education
Schools in Keremeos' vicinity include Cawston primary school, Penticton Secondary School, Princess Margaret Secondary School, Osoyoos, Princeton, and Similkameen Elementary Secondary School.

References

External links

Villages in British Columbia
Populated places in the Similkameen